Grigori Vladimirovich Ivanov (born 28 November 1971) is a former Russian professional footballer.

Club career
He made his professional debut in the Soviet First League in 1990 for FC Spartak Vladikavkaz.

Honours
 Russian Premier League runner-up: 1992.

References

1971 births
Sportspeople from Grozny
Living people
Soviet footballers
Russian footballers
Russian Premier League players
FC Spartak Vladikavkaz players
FC Metalurh Zaporizhzhia players
FC Rostov players
FC Luch Vladivostok players
FC Volgar Astrakhan players
Association football forwards
FC Lukhovitsy players
FC Nosta Novotroitsk players